Brayan is a masculine given name. Notable people with this name include:

Association football (soccer)
 Brayan Angulo (footballer, born 1989), Colombian footballer
 Brayan Angulo (footballer, born 1993),  Colombian footballer
 Brayan Beckeles (born 1985), Honduran footballer
 Brayan Ceballos (born 2001), Colombian footballer
 Brayan Cortés (born 1995), Chilean footballer
 Brayan García (born 1993), Honduran footballer
 Brayan Garnica (born 1996), Mexican footballer
 Brayan Gómez (born 2000), Colombian footballer
 Brayan Gil (born 2001), Colombian footballer
 Brayan Guevara (born 1998), Peruvian footballer
 Brayan Hurtado (born 1999), Venezuelan footballer
 Brayan López (footballer, born 1987), Colombian footballer
 Brayan López (footballer, born 1990), Costa Rican-born footballer for Nicaragua
 Brayan Lucumí (born 1994), Colombian footballer
 Brayan Martínez (born 1990), Mexican footballer
 Brayan Moreno (born 1998), Colombian footballer
 Brayan Moya (born 1993), Honduran footballer
 Brayan Palmezano (born 2000), Venezuelan footballer
 Brayan Perea (born 1993), Colombian footballer
 Brayan Ramírez (footballer) (born 1994), Honduran footballer
 Brayan Reyes (born 1991), Honduran footballer
 Brayan Riascos (born 1994), Colombian footballer
 Brayan Rojas (born 1997), Costa Rican footballer
 Brayan Rovira (born 1996), Colombian footballer
 Brayan de la Torre (born 1991), Ecuadorian footballer
 Brayan Torres (born 1998), Colombian footballer
 Brayan Véjar (born 1995), Chilean footballer
 Brayan Velásquez (born 1996), Honduran footballer
 Brayan Vera (born 1999), Colombian footballer
 Brayan Villalobos (born 1998), Mexican footballer

Baseball
 Brayan Bello (born 1999), Dominican baseball pitcher
 Brayan Peña (born 1982), Cuban-American baseball catcher
 Brayan Villarreal (born 1987), Venezuelan baseball pitcher

Cycling
 Brayan Ramírez (cyclist) (born 1992), Colombian racing cyclist
 Brayan Sánchez (born 1994), Colombian road and track cyclist

Other sports
 Brayan Lopez (athlete) (born 1997), Italian sprinter
 Brayan Rodallegas (born 1997), Colombian weightlifter

See also
 
 
 Brayann Pereira (born 2003), French footballer
 Brian
 Brien
 Bryan (given name)

Given names
Masculine given names